The 1996 Yale Bulldogs football team represented Yale University in the 1996 NCAA Division I-AA football season.  The Bulldogs were led by head coach Carmen Cozza in his 32nd and final season. They played their home games at the Yale Bowl and finished tied for fourth place in the Ivy League with a 3–4 record, 5–5 overall.

Schedule

Roster

References

Yale
Yale Bulldogs football seasons
Yale Bulldogs football